Santana da Vargem is a municipality in the south of the Brazilian state of Minas Gerais.  In 2020 the population was 7,073 in a total area of 173 km².  The elevation of the municipal seat is 804 meters.  Santana da Vargem became a municipality in 1962

Location
Neighboring municipalities are Três Pontas, Campos Gerais, Boa Esperança, and Coqueiral.  Santana da Vargem is part of the IBGE statistical microregion of Varginha.  It is 15 km north of Três Pontas and 41 km. north of Varginha.  Lavras is 65 km. to the east.  
The distance to Belo Horizonte is 261 km. and the distance to Rio de Janeiro is 440 km.  The main highways serving the city are BR-381
and BR-265.

Economy
The main economic activities are agriculture, especially the growing of coffee, and production of milk and cheese.  In 2006 there were 411 rural properties with agricultural land area of 13,153.  The main crops were coffee, with 9,000 ha. planted, corn, with 1,200 ha, and various fruits like oranges, bananas, and passion fruit.  There was one financial institution.   

In the health sector there were 4 public health clinics.  There were 6 primary schools and 1 middle school.

Municipal Human Development Index
MHDI: .749
State ranking: 292 out of 853 municipalities 
National ranking: 1,909 out of 5,138 municipalities
Life expectancy: 70 years at birth
Literacy rate: 85% (See Frigoletto for the complete list)

References

City government site
IBGE

Municipalities in Minas Gerais